Benjamin Abraham Braun (born November 25, 1953) is an American former men's college basketball coach and college basketball analyst. He served as the head men's basketball coach at Siena Heights University (1977–1985), Eastern Michigan University (1986–1996), the University of California, Berkeley (1996–2008), and Rice University (2008–2014), compiling a career coaching record of 615–517.  He won the most games (185) of any head coach history of the Eastern Michigan Eagles men's basketball program and was named Mid-American Conference Coach of the Year three times. As the head coach of the California Golden Bears, he won the Pac-10 Coach of the Year and had a 219–154 record (.587). Braun currently is a studio and game basketball analyst for the Pac-12 Network.

Early and personal life
Braun was born in Chicago, Illinois and is Jewish. His father is Academy Award nominee producer Zev Braun.  He graduated from New Trier High School in Winnetka, Illinois, where he excelled on both the basketball team and, as a shortstop, on the baseball team.

Braun played one year of basketball at the University of Wisconsin–La Crosse. He then transferred to the University of Wisconsin–Madison. He earned a teaching degree in English, with a minor in African-American Studies, in June 1975. He earned a master's degree in guidance and counseling from Siena Heights in 1980.

He and his wife, Jessica, have a son Julius and a daughter Eliza.

Basketball coaching career
After graduating from Wisconsin in 1975, Braun began his career as an assistant coach at Washington Park High School in Racine, Wisconsin. After two years of coaching high school basketball, he accepted the head coaching job at Siena Heights University. Braun coached Siena Heights for eight years, taking the National Association of Intercollegiate Athletics (NAIA) school to a 148–103 record and five postseason tournaments.

Prior to the 1985–86 season, Braun took on the position of associate head coach at Eastern Michigan. Midway through the year, on January 15, 1986, he was elevated to interim head coach. Within two years his Hurons (Eagles from 1991 onwards) were in the NCAA Tournament for the first time in school history. During his 11 years at Eastern Michigan, he guided the Eagles to four postseason berths, including three NCAA appearances. Braun accumulated a record of 185–132 and was named Mid-American Conference Coach of the Year three times. His 185 wins are the most by a coach in Eastern Michigan Eagles men's basketball history.

In the summer of 1989, he was the head coach of the U.S. men's basketball team at the 1989 Maccabiah Games. The team lost to Team Israel in the final.

Braun replaced Todd Bozeman as the head coach at Cal prior to the 1996–97 season. Expectations were low as the Golden Bears were predicted to finish in the bottom half of the conference. However, the team finished tied for second in the conference and reached the NCAA Sweet 16. The team finished the season 23–9 and gave Braun a school record for most wins by a Bear coach in his first year with the program. Braun went on to win the Pac-10 Coach of the Year – the first Cal coach to ever receive the award.

In the 1998–99 season, Braun's club defeated North Carolina, UCLA, and Arizona during the course of the year to become the first team ever at Cal to beat three Top 10 schools in the same season. Then after entering the NIT, the Bears, led by Geno Carlisle, won five consecutive postseason games to capture the NIT title – Cal's first postseason tournament championship since the Bears won the 1959 NCAA title. Cal finished the 1998–99 campaign with a 22–11 record.

In 2000–01, the Bears returned to the NCAA Tournament, finishing with a 20–11 record, and Sean Lampley – Braun's first recruit at Cal after NCAA sanctions were lifted from Bozeman's tenure – became the school's all-time leading scorer late in his senior campaign, finishing with 1,776 points.

In 2001–02, the Bears again went 23–9 and tied for second in the Pac-10 standings. Cal earned a No. 6 seed in the NCAA playoffs, where the Bears toppled Penn before falling to Pittsburgh in the second round.

In 2002–03, Cal again reached the second round of the NCAA Tournament behind All-Pac-10 forwards Joe Shipp and Amit Tamir. Shipp ended his career in the No. 3 position on the Bears' all-time scoring list, while teammate Brian Wethers finished in the No. 15 position.

In 2005–06, Cal defeated USC and Oregon to reach the Pac-10 Tournament final for the first time ever. Leon Powe and the Bears then earned a No. 7 regional seed in the NCAA Tournament and finished the year with a 20–11 mark. On November 21, 2005, Cal defeated Long Beach State, 88–69, to give Braun his 500th career win.

Two days after losing to Ohio State in the 2008 National Invitation Tournament, Braun was fired as head coach of the Golden Bears on March 26, 2008. During his tenure at Cal, Braun directed the Bears to more postseason appearances and more postseason victories than any coach in school history. His 219 wins in 12 years are second to Nibs Price (1925–54, 449–294) in both tenure and wins at Cal, while his Cal winning percentage (.606) is the best at the school since Hall of Famer Pete Newell guided the Bears to a 119–44 mark from 1955–60.

Braun was hired as the head men's coach at Rice, replacing Willis Wilson in 2008. He resigned on March 13, 2014, after six seasons with the Owls, compiling a 63–128 record.

Head coaching record

See also
 List of college men's basketball coaches with 600 wins

References

External links
 Rice profile
 California profile
 

1953 births
Living people
American men's basketball players
Basketball coaches from Illinois
Basketball players from Chicago
California Golden Bears men's basketball coaches
College men's basketball head coaches in the United States
Eastern Michigan Eagles men's basketball coaches
New Trier High School alumni
Rice Owls men's basketball coaches
Siena Heights Saints men's basketball coaches
Siena Heights University alumni
Wisconsin Badgers men's basketball players
Wisconsin–La Crosse Eagles men's basketball players